Dorrie Costello is a former Fijian international lawn bowler.

Bowls career
In 1969 she just missed out on a singles bronze medal after finishing fourth on points difference at the 1969 World Outdoor Bowls Championship in Sydney, Australia. She did however win a bronze medal is a member of the team that finished third in the team event (Taylor Trophy).

References

Living people
Fijian female bowls players
Year of birth missing (living people)